Colon Street (Cebuano: Dalan Colon;) is a historical street in Cebu City. Located in the city's downtown, Colon Street is often referred to as the oldest and the shortest national road in the Philippines. It is named after Cristóbal Colón (Christopher Columbus). Built in 1565, the street traces its origins to  Miguel Lopez de Legazpi, the Spanish conquistador who arrived in the Philippines to establish a colony in the 16th century, and eventually developed the street under his leadership. 

Colon, crowded and a bit run-down now, was the site of fashionable shops, offices, and movie houses. It was once the heart of Cebu City's shopping and business activity, but in recent years  (specifically during the early 1990s), much of this activity has shifted to the more modern, bigger, and diverse commercial and business districts now spread in almost all of the urban areas of the city in what was considered residential and leisure settlements.

In 2006, the Cebu City Council proposed a plan to close parts of Colon street from vehicular traffic and convert it to a tourism zone. However, this was met with much opposition from businessmen and motorists due to concerns regarding security and parking spaces.

In 2007, the Colon Night Market, which aims to revive Colon as a vibrant commercial hub, was launched. The night market runs multiple times throughout the year, most notably during the Filipino Christmas season from September to December up to Sinulog celebrations in January in the following year. Since its launch, the night market has ran every year with the exemption of 2020 and 2021 due to the COVID-19 pandemic.

See also 
 Calle Escolta, a historic street in Manila, Philippines
 Calle Real, a historic street in Iloilo City, Philippines

References 

Streets in Cebu City